Kanhalli is a village in the southern state of Karnataka, India. Administratively, Kanhalli is under Baichabal gram panchayat, Hunasagi Taluka of Yadgir District in Karnataka.  The village of Kanhalli is 2.3 km by road east of the village of Baichbal and 9 km by road west of the village of Peth Ammapur. The nearest railhead is in Yadgir.

Demographics 
 census, the village of Kanhalli had 2,965 inhabitants, with 1,496 males and 1,469 females.

Notes

External links 
 

Villages in Yadgir district